SB-431542 is a drug candidate developed by GlaxoSmithKline (GSK) as an inhibitor of the activin receptor-like kinase (ALK) receptors, ALK5, ALK4 and ALK7.  However, it is not an inhibitor of anaplastic lymphoma kinase (which are commonly known as ALK inhibitors).

In-vitro studies
While SB-431542 has not proved directly useful for any clinical application, it is used for several applications in molecular biology. It suppresses the TGF-beta-induced proliferation of osteosarcoma cells in humans. Treatment with SB431542 is a robust, clinically applicable, and efficient system for generating mesenchymal stem/stromal cells (MSCs) from human iPSCs. SB431542 can also be used in combination with LDN193189, CHIR99021 and DAPT to transform astrocytes into neurons. It is also commonly used for immunological studies, for instance as a TGF-β inhibitor to facilitate the generation of dendritic cells from peripheral blood monocytes.

References 

Protein kinase inhibitors
Imidazoles
Benzodioxoles
Carboxamides